The New Mexico Wind Energy Center officially opened on October 1, 2003. Located 170 miles southeast of Albuquerque and 20 miles northeast of Fort Sumner, the wind farm is well suited for eastern New Mexico's windy landscape.

The wind center consists of 136 wind turbines, each standing 210 feet high. The facility can produce up to 200 megawatts of power, which is enough electricity to power 94,000 average New Mexico homes.  Electricity production does not require water, produce emissions, or generate solid waste.

FPL Energy owns and manages the facility, while PNM purchases all of its output.

See also

List of wind farms
List of wind farms in the United States

References

Buildings and structures in De Baca County, New Mexico
Buildings and structures in Quay County, New Mexico
Energy infrastructure completed in 2003
Wind farms in New Mexico